Fère-en-Tardenois (literally Fère in Tardenois) is a commune in the Aisne department in Hauts-de-France in northern France.

It is named for the Tardenois region.

Population

Personalities
It was the birthplace of Camille Claudel (1864–1943), sculptor and graphic artist.

Sights
The Château de Fère-en-Tardenois dates originally from 1206, with later important Renaissance alterations.

The Oise-Aisne American Cemetery and Memorial is one and a half miles east of Fère-en-Tardenois. It contains the graves of 6,012 American soldiers who died while fighting in this vicinity during World War I including the poet, Joyce Kilmer and, until 1987, Eddie Slovik, a deserter and the first American soldier to be executed for desertion since the American Civil War.

See also
 Communes of the Aisne department
 Histoire de Fère-en-Tardenois, Tome II

References

Communes of Aisne
Champagne (province)
Aisne communes articles needing translation from French Wikipedia